Football Club Auch Gers is a French rugby union club based in Auch in Midi-Pyrénées most recently playing in the promotion-eligible pool of Fédérale 1. In recent years, they have mainly bounced between the first-level Top 14 and Pro D2. In a five-year stretch between 2003 and 2004 and 2007–08, they were either promoted or relegated four times—promoted to the then-Top 16 as champions of Pro D2 in 2004, relegated in 2005, promoted as Pro D2 champions again in 2007, and relegated as bottom finisher in 2008. Founded in 1891, the club plays at Stade Jacques Fouroux (capacity 7,000); its players wear red and white.

Auch was founded in 1897. They were runners-up in the 2001 League Cup competition, losing to Montferrand (Clermont) in the final. In the 2000s they were playing in the second division on French rugby, and in the 2002–03 season they made the semi-finals toward promotion but were defeated by Montpellier. However the following season they were promoted to the top league, defeating Bayonne in the Pro D2 final.

However they were relegated back down to Pro D2 for the 2005–06 season. Nonetheless, they were also winners of the European Shield, reprechage tournament for teams knocked out in the first round of the European Challenge Cup that season. They defeated English club Worcester in the final.

At the end of the 2013–2014 season, the club was relegated to the amateur Fédérale 1. At the close of 2016–2017, bankruptcy was declared. The professional club was dissolved after financial rescue efforts failed. The lower level teams and school will remain, with an eye toward eventual reconstitution of the flagship pro team. The B team won the 2017 Nationale B championship.

Honours
 League Cup:
 Runners-up: 2001
 Rugby Pro D2:
 Champions: 1947, 2004, 2007
 European Shield:
 Champions: 2005

Finals results

League Cup

European Shield

Pro D2 winners

Current standings

Club dissolved at end of 2016–17 season.

Current squad

Club dissolved at end of 2016–17 season.

Former players
  David Spicer
  Sakiusa Matadigo
  Fabien Barcella
  Jacques Fouroux
  Franck Montanella
  Mamuka Magrakvelidze
  Ruben Spachuck
  Raphaël Bastide
  Sandu Ciorăscu
  Kaiongo Tupou
  Jean-Claude Skrela
  Francisco De La Fuente
  Juan Murré
  David Penalva
  Sergio Valdes
  Mathieu Peluchon

Current Internationals
  Marcel Laurent
  Henri Lazies
  Antoine Bianco
  Jean Le Droff
  Serge Marsolan
  Jean-Claude Skrela
  Jacques Fouroux
  Jacques Gratton
  Stéphane Graou
  Frédéric Torossian
  Patrick Tabacco
  Yannick Bru
  Christophe Porcu
  Jean-Baptiste Rué
  Arnaud Mignardi
  Franck Montanella
  Fabien Barcella
  Antoine Dupont
  Anthony Jelonch
  Gabriel Lacroix
  Pierre Bourgarit
  Grégory Alldritt

Further reading
 Mes saisons 1903–2003 : F.C. Auch : Auch en Gascogne et le rugby, cent ans d'amour-passion, de Roland Porterie, éd. Football club auscitain, 2003

See also
 List of rugby union clubs in France
 Rugby union in France

References

External links
  FC Auch Gers Official website

Auch
Rugby clubs established in 1897
Sport in Gers
1897 establishments in France